The Khakas (also spelled Khakass; Khakas:  , khakas / xakas, tadar, khakastar / xakastar, tadarlar) are a Turkic indigenous people of Siberia, who live in the republic of Khakassia, Russia. They speak the Khakas language.

The Khakhassian people are direct descendants of various ancient cultures that have inhabited southern Siberia, including the Andronovo culture, Samoyedic peoples, the Tagar culture, and the Yenisei Kirghiz culture.

Despite the name, the Fuyu Kyrgyz language is not related to the Kyrgyz language, which is of Kipchak origin. The Fuyu Kyrgyz language is more similar to the Yughur language and the Abakan Turkic languages.

History 

The Yenisei Kirghiz were made to pay tribute in a treaty concluded between the Dzungars and Russians in 1635. The Dzungar Oirat Kalmyks coerced the Yenisei Kirghiz into submission.

Some of the Yenisei Kirghiz were relocated into the Dzungar Khanate by the Dzungars, and then the Qing moved them from Dzungaria to northeastern China in 1761, where they became known as the Fuyu Kyrgyz. Sibe Bannermen were stationed in Dzungaria while Northeastern China (Manchuria) was where some of the remaining Öelet Oirats were deported to. The Nonni basin was where Oirat Öelet deportees were settled. The Yenisei Kirghiz were deported along with the Öelet. Chinese and Oirat replaced Oirat and Kirghiz during Manchukuo as the dual languages of the Nonni-based Yenisei Kirghiz.

In the 17th century, the Khakas formed Khakassia in the middle of the lands of Yenisei Kirghiz, who at the time were vassals of a Mongolian ruler.  The Russians arrived shortly after the Kirghiz left, and an inflow of Russian agragian settlers began.  In the 1820s, gold mines started to be developed around Minusinsk, which became a regional industrial center.

The names Khongorai and Khoorai were applied to the Khakas before they became known as the Khakas. Khakas people refer to themselves as Tadar. Khoorai (Khorray) has also been in use to refer to them. Now the Khakas call themselves Tadar and do not use Khakas to describe themselves in their own language. They are also called Abaka Tatars.

During the 19th century, many Khakas accepted the Russian ways of life, and most were converted en masse to Russian Orthodox Christianity. Shamanism, however, is still common; it has Buddhist influences. Many Christians practice shamanism with Christianity. In Imperial Russia, the Khakas used to be known under other names, used mostly in historic contexts: Minusinsk Tatars, Abakan Tatars (абака́нские тата́ры), and Yenisei Turks.

During the Revolution of 1905, a movement towards autonomy developed. When Soviets came to power in 1923, the Khakas National District was established, and various ethnic groups (Beltir, Sagai, Kachin, Koibal, and Kyzyl) were artificially "combined" into one—the Khakas.  The National District was reorganized into Khakas Autonomous Oblast, a part of Krasnoyarsk Krai, in 1930. The Republic of Khakassia in its present form was established in 1992.

The Khakas people account for only about 12% of the total population of the republic (78,500 as of 1989 Census). The Khakas people traditionally practiced nomadic herding, agriculture, hunting, and fishing.  The Beltir people specialized in handicraft as well. Herding sheep and cattle is still common, although the republic became more industrialized over time.

Genetics

Paternal lineages 
Genetic research has identified 4 primary paternal lineages in the Khakhas population.

 Haplogroup N is the predominant paternal haplogroup in the Khakhas population. It represents roughly 64% of Khakas male lineages, mainly N1b (P43) and N1c (M178). It has been proposed that haplogroup N1b (specifically N2a1-B478) in the Khakassians may represent descent from Samoyedic speakers who were assimilated by Turkic speakers.

 Haplogroup R1a is the second most common haplogroup in Khakhas populations; representing 27.9-33% of the total. Haplogroup R1a has the predominant paternal haplogroup in the Altai region since the appearance of the Andronovo culture. It representes a migration of Indo-European speakers who migrated east and settled in central Siberia in the Bronze and Iron Age periods, such as the Indo-Iranian Andronovo culture and the Tagar culture. 

Other paternal haplogroups in Khakassians include Haplogroup Q, which is probably the "original" Siberian lineage in Khakassians. It has a frequency of approximately 4.8% in the Khakassian population. Minor frequencies of haplogroups R1b, C3, and E1 were also reported.

Maternal lineages 

Over 80% of Khakassian mtDNA lineages belong to East Eurasian lineages, although a significant percentage (18.9%) belong to various West Eurasian mtDNA lineages.

Religion
At present, the Khakas predominantly are Orthodox Christians (Russian Orthodox Church). 

Also there is traditional shamanism (Tengrism), including following movements:
 Khakas Heritage Center—the Society of Traditional Religion of Khakas Shamanism "Ah-Chayan";
 Traditional religion of the Khakas people society "Izykh";
 Traditional religion society "Khan Tigir".

See also
Music of Khakassia

References

External links

 NUPI - Centre for Asian Studies profile
 The Sleeping Warrior: New Legends in the Rebirth of Khakass Shamanic Culture
 Abakan city streets views
  Beyaz Arif Akbas, "Khakassia: The Lost Land", Portland State Center for Turkish Studies, 2007.

Ethnic groups in Russia
Ethnic groups in Siberia
Indigenous peoples of North Asia
Turkic peoples of Asia